Neptune is a former steam packet which served a route between New York and Charleston, South Carolina, and later served a route between New Orleans and Galveston, Texas.

New York–Charleston packet
Neptune was built in 1837 for the New York and Charleston Steam Packet Company. In 1838, a reorganization of the partnership led to the sale of Neptune to James Pennoyer.

New Orleans–Galveston packet
Neptune competed for the New Orleans to Galveston trade in the early 1840s, challenging the New York.  The steamer could lodge thirty persons in the cabin, and had a steerage capacity of forty. It broke a speed record for the route in 1841 when it reached New Orleans in a mere forty hours, shaving a full five hours off the previous record.

References

Steamboats of the United States